"Don't Leave Me" is the fourteenth single by B'z, released on February 9, 1994. This song is one of B'z many number-one singles in Oricon chart, selling 800,000 copies in its first week. It sold over 1,444,000 copies according to Oricon. The song won "the best five single award" at the 9th Japan Gold Disc Award.

It was used as the drama Shin Kūkō Monogatari's theme song.

Track listing 
Don't Leave Me - 4:23
Mannequin Village - 3:42

Certifications

References

External links
B'z official website

1994 singles
B'z songs
Oricon Weekly number-one singles
Japanese television drama theme songs
Songs written by Tak Matsumoto
Songs written by Koshi Inaba
1994 songs